Thompson Media Group, LLC, originally established as Thompson Publishing Group, Inc. was founded in 1972 by Richard E. Thompson. Thompson Media Group is an American privately held media company that specializes in providing compliance, regulatory, and market information through its four operating units: Thompson Information Services, The Performance Institute & American Strategic Management Institute, AHC & BioWorld, and Sheshunoff Information Services, A.S. Pratt, & Alex Information (collectively, SIS). Thompson Media Group, LLC, is based in Washington, DC. Thompson Media Group LLC established their name during reorganization in 2011.

In 2013, Thompson sold its properties:
 AHC was sold to private investors and Lone Peak Capital Group
 The Performance Institute was sold to Robbins-Gioa Inc.
 Thompson Information Services was sold to Columbia Books & Information Services.
 BioWorld and Medical Device Daily were sold to Thomson Reuters
 Sheshunoff and A.S. Pratt were sold to LexisNexis

Background

Thompson Publishing Group is a privately held law and education books publishing company that was founded in 1972 by Richard E. Thompson under the name of Thompson Publishing Group and based in Washington, DC. The Group publishes subscription-based regulatory & compliance information. Thompson was reorganized under the name Thompson Media Group LLC (TMG) in 2011.

The Performance Institute and American Strategic Management Institute
In 2007, Thompson Publishing Group, now Thompson Media Group acquired The Performance Institute and The American Strategic Management Institute from founder Carl DeMaio. The Performance Institute is a private, non-partisan think-tank in the United States that specializes in improving government results through the principles of performance, transparency and accountability.

AHC Media 
In August 2006, Thompson Publishing Group acquired a leading provider of healthcare information products AHC Media. AHC Media operates as a publisher of health care newsletters in the fields of clinical medicine, health care management, biotechnology, and medical devices.  The company was founded in 1974 and is based in Atlanta, Georgia. AHC also provides accredited continuing education for physicians, nurses, & pharmacists. The combined company has a diverse portfolio of publications and services representing more than 350 print and electronic products as well as hundreds of conferences serving approximately 135,000 customers.

Sheshunoff | Pratt 
In 2005, Thompson Publishing Group acquired Sheshunoff Information Services (SIS; Austin, TX) from company founders Gabrielle Sheshunoff, other management and investment firm Austin Ventures (Austin, TX).

In 2013, LexisNexis, together with Reed Elsevier Properties SA, acquired publishing brands and businesses of Sheshunoff and A.S. Pratt from Thompson Media Group.

Sheshunoff Information Services, A.S. Pratt, & Alex Information (collectively, SIS), founded in 1972, is a print and electronic publishing company that provides information to financial and legal professionals in the banking industry, as well as online training and solutions for financial institutions. SIS was founded in 1971 by Alex and Gabrielle Sheshunoff. The company became recognized for providing guidance and analysis to the banking industry. In 1988 Thomson Media, a division Thomson Reuters, acquired the company. Separately, the Sheshunoffs began publishing Alex Information products.

In 1995 SIS acquired A.S. Pratt & Sons. Established in 1933, "Pratt's Letter" is believed to be the second oldest continuously published newsletter in the country behind "Kiplinger's Washington Letter," which began publication in 1923. A.S. Pratt is a provider of regulatory law and compliance work solutions for the financial services industry.

Gabrielle Sheshunoff returned in 2004 to unite the AlexInformation, Sheshunoff, and A.S. Pratt brands before it was sold to Thompson in 2008.

Current operation
Thompson provides regulatory compliance information for professionals in business and government through books, loose-leaf, newsletters, audio conferences, Web subscription products, and email advisory alerts. The company also operates HR Compliance Online.com, an online solution for HR and benefits administrators that provide information on fair labor standards act, domestic partner benefits, family and medical leave act, workplace retaliation, consumer-directed health care, Americans with disabilities act, 401(k) plans, fringe benefits, employee handbooks, and flex benefits.

Thompson publishes books that focus on regulatory compliance advice for professionals in health care, human resources and other industries. Their predominant areas of publishing are:

 Human Resources
 Grants
 Education, including Title I
 Food and Drug Administration
 Environment Compliance and Energy
 Health Care
 Broadband Regulation
 Finance & Securities Regulation

See also
 Good Government Organizations (United States)

References

External links
 Official website

Publishing companies of the United States
Think tanks based in the United States
Companies based in Arlington County, Virginia
Privately held companies of the United States
Government watchdog groups in the United States
Publishing companies established in 1972